The 1977 Vuelta a España was the 32nd edition of the Vuelta a España, one of cycling's Grand Tours. The Vuelta began in Dehesa de Campoamor, with a prologue individual time trial on 26 April, and Stage 11a occurred on 7 May with a stage from Barcelona. The race finished in Miranda de Ebro on 15 May.

Stage 11a
7 May 1977 — Barcelona to Barcelona,  (ITT)

Stage 11b
7 May 1977 — Barcelona to Barcelona,

Stage 12

Stage 13
9 May 1977 — Igualada to La Seu d'Urgell,

Stage 14
10 May 1977 — La Seu d'Urgell to Monzón,

Stage 15
11 May 1977 — Monzón to Formigal,

Stage 16
12 May 1977 — Formigal to Cordovilla,

Stage 17
13 May 1977 — Cordovilla to Bilbao,

Stage 18
14 May 1977 — Bilbao to Urkiola,

Stage 19
15 May 1977 — Durango to Miranda de Ebro,

References

1977 Vuelta a España
Vuelta a España stages